"Rhiannon" (released as a single under the title "Rhiannon (Will You Ever Win)") is a song written by Stevie Nicks and originally recorded by the British-American rock band Fleetwood Mac on their eponymous album in 1975; it was issued as a single the following year.  The song's U.S. chart peak was in June 1976, when it hit no. 11. The song peaked at no. 46 in the UK singles chart for three weeks after re-release in February 1978.

"Rhiannon" was voted no. 488 in The 500 Greatest Songs of All Time by Rolling Stone magazine. They also ranked the song number six on their list of the 50 greatest Fleetwood Mac songs.

When Nicks performed the song live, she often introduced it by saying "This is a song about an old Welsh witch." During 1975–1980, Fleetwood Mac's live performances of "Rhiannon" took on a theatrical intensity not present on the FM-radio single. The song built to a climax in which Nicks' vocals were so impassioned that, as drummer and band co-founder Mick Fleetwood recalled, "her Rhiannon in those days was like an exorcism."

Background
Nicks discovered the Rhiannon character in the early 1970s through a novel called Triad by Mary Bartlet Leader. The novel is about a woman named Branwen who is possessed by a witch named Rhiannon. There is mention of the Welsh legend of Rhiannon in the novel, but the characters in the novel bear little resemblance to their original Welsh namesakes (both Rhiannon and Branwen are major female characters in the medieval Welsh prose tales of the Mabinogion).

After writing the song, Nicks learned that Rhiannon originated from a Welsh goddess, and was amazed that the haunting song lyrics applied to the Welsh Rhiannon as well. Nicks researched the Mabinogion story and began work on a Rhiannon project, unsure of whether it would become a movie, a musical, a cartoon, or a ballet. There were several Rhiannon-centered and themed songs from this unfinished project, including "Stay Away" and "Maker of Birds." Additionally, Nicks wrote the Fleetwood Mac song "Angel" based on the Rhiannon story.

Reception
Billboard described "Rhiannon" as a "haunting song" with an "infectious melody".  Record World said that "Stevie Nicks' vocal evokes a magic that is hard to ignore on this scintillating track."

Personnel
Fleetwood Mac
 Stevie Nicks – lead vocals
 Lindsey Buckingham – guitar, background vocals
 Christine McVie – keyboards, background vocals
 John McVie – bass guitar
 Mick Fleetwood – drums

Charts

Weekly charts

Re-issue

Year-end charts

Certifications

In popular culture
Author Glen Cook stated in an interview that the title for his novel She Is the Darkness was taken from the lyrics of "Rhiannon".
The song made an appearance in the second episode of American Horror Story: Coven and was subsequently performed by Nicks herself in a guest appearance in the tenth episode, "The Magical Delights of Stevie Nicks".

References

External links
 Song lyrics at the official Fleetwood Mac site

1975 songs
1976 singles
Reprise Records singles
Fleetwood Mac songs
Songs written by Stevie Nicks
Song recordings produced by Keith Olsen
Celtic mythology in music
Songs about witches